Lux Capital is a venture capital firm based in New York City. It was founded in 2000, and focuses on investments in emerging technologies.

History
Lux Capital was founded in 2000 by Peter Hébert, Robert Paull and Josh Wolfe. In April 2011, former McKinsey Senior Partner Richard N. Foster and former CIA Director James Woolsey joined the organisation in senior management roles. In August 2012, former Pfizer head Jeff Kindler joined the organisation in similar capacities. 

The organisation had raised approximately $1 billion in investment funds by August 2019. By June 2021, it had raised approximately $1.5 billion in investment funds.

Portfolio companies

 3Scan
AltspaceVR
 Anduril
 Applied Intuition
Auris Health
Bright Machines
Clarifai
Desktop Metal
 Everspin Technologies
 Kymeta
 Luxtera
 Nanosys
Nervana Systems
Orbital Insight
 Planet Labs
 Siluria Technologies
 Transphorm

See also
 Entrepreneurship
 Venture Capital
 Startup company

References

Private equity firms of the United States
Venture capital firms of the United States
Financial services companies established in 2000
Companies based in New York City